Frederick Henry Boland (11 January 1904 – 4 December 1985) was an Irish diplomat who served as the first Irish Ambassador to both the United Kingdom and the United Nations.

Family and education 
Frederick Boland was born on 11 January 1904 at 32 Eden Vale Road, Ranelagh, the second son of Henry Patrick ("H.P.") Boland (1876-1956), a civil servant in the Department of Posts and Telegraphs (retiring as Senior Assistant Secretary to the Minister for Finance), and his wife Charlotte Nolan Taylor. H.P. Boland was son of the workhouse master at Clonmel.

Boland was educated at Clongowes Wood College, St Olave's Grammar School, Trinity College and King's Inns, Dublin, where he received his BA and LLB degrees. He also did a degree in Classics at Trinity. He did graduate work at Harvard, the University of Chicago, and the University of North Carolina at Chapel Hill in 1926 to 1928 as a Rockefeller Research Fellow. He received an Honorary LLD degree from the University of Dublin.

They had a son, Fergal and four daughters; Jane, Nessa, Mella, and the poet Eavan Boland.

Career 
Boland was Assistant Secretary of the Department of External Affairs from 1939 to 1946, prior to becoming the Secretary, which position he held until 1950. In that role he led negotiations in 1949 that changed Ireland's status from a Dominion within the Commonwealth to a Republic outside it. He was privately critical of the manner in which the Taoiseach, John A. Costello, handled the matter, saying that "he has as much notion of diplomacy as I have of astrology."

He served as the first Irish Ambassador to the Court of St James's in London from 1950 to 1956, a move generally attributed to his inability to work harmoniously with Seán MacBride (Minister for External Affairs 1948–51). In 1956, he became Ireland's Ambassador to the United Nations. Boland was the president of the General Assembly of the United Nations on 12 October 1960, when Nikita Khrushchev allegedly took off his shoe and pounded it on his desk.

Boland served as the 21st Chancellor of Trinity College Dublin between 1963 and 1982. He was made an honorary fellow of Trinity College Dublin in 1983.

References

External links
UN bio of Boland
Irish Mission to United Nations
On Irish UN stamp 2005 
Transcript of election to Presidency of General Assembly 1960

1904 births
1985 deaths
Chancellors of the University of Dublin
Harvard University alumni
University of Chicago alumni
University of North Carolina at Chapel Hill alumni
Diplomats from Dublin (city)
Honorary Fellows of Trinity College Dublin
Presidents of the United Nations General Assembly
Permanent Representatives of Ireland to the United Nations
People educated at Clongowes Wood College
Alumni of Trinity College Dublin
Ambassadors of Ireland to the United Kingdom
Alumni of King's Inns